This is a list of festivals in Toronto, Ontario, Canada.  This list includes festivals of diverse types, such as regional festivals, commerce festivals, fairs, food festivals, arts festivals, religious festivals, folk festivals, and recurring festivals on holidays. The city hosts several large festivals each year including Canada's largest gay pride festival, national exhibition, and film festival.

Festivals

 BIG on Bloor Festival of Arts & Culture
 Cabbagetown Fall Festival
 Cabbagetown Forsythia Festival 
 Canadian National Exhibition
 Cityfest
 FIVARS Festival of International Virtual & Augmented Reality Stories
 Indie Week Canada
 International Festival Of Authors
 The Junction Summer Solstice Festival
 Pride Toronto
 Royal Agricultural Winter Fair
 Tdot Fest
 Toronto International Dragon Boat Festival

Arts, dance and theatre

 Harbourfront World Stage
 International Festival of Authors
 Luminato
 Next Stage Festival
 Nuit Blanche Toronto
 Progress (International Festival Of Performance And Ideas)
 Rhubarb
 Summerworks
 Toronto Fringe Festival
 U of T Drama Festival
 U of T Festival of Dance 2018
 Word on the Street

Cultural

 Ashkenaz Festival of Yiddish Culture
 Latin Sparks Toronto
 Toronto African Film & Music Festival
 Toronto Caribbean Carnival
 Toronto Chinese Lantern Festival
 Toronto Ukrainian Festival
 Toronto Polish Festival
 Scarborough Community Multicultural Festival
 Scarborough Afro-Caribbean Fest
 Toronto Halal Ribfest

Fashion & interior design
 Toronto Design Offsite Festival
 Toronto Design Week
 Toronto Fashion Week

Food & beverage

Toronto Garlic Festival
Taste of the Kingsway
Taste of Toronto
Taste of the Danforth
Taste of the Manila
Toronto Ribfest

Film

Blood in the Snow Canadian Film Festival
Canadian Filmmakers' Festival
CaribbeanTales International Film Festival
Cinéfranco
Hot Docs Canadian International Documentary Festival
ICFF, Italian Contemporary Film Festival
ImagineNATIVE Film and Media Arts Festival
Inside Out Film and Video Festival
Lost Episode Festival
Reelworld Film Festival
Regent Park Film Festival
Ryerson University Film Festival
Toronto After Dark Film Festival
Toronto Black Film Festival
Toronto International Film Festival
Toronto International Teen Film Festival
Toronto Jewish Film Festival
Toronto Queer Film Festival
Toronto Reel Asian Film Festival
Toronto Student Film Festival
Toronto South African Film Festival
Toronto Youth Sports Film Festival

Music

Beaches International Jazz Festival
CBC Music Fest
Canadian Music Week
Curiosa
Choral Mosaic
Edgefest
Heavy T.O.
Kumbaya Festival
Molson Canadian Rocks for Toronto
MusicFest Canada
North by Northeast
Olympic Island Festival
OVO Fest
Rogers Picnic
Toronto Jazz Festival
Toronto Rock and Roll Revival
VELD Music Festival
Virgin Festival
Wakestock
Wavelength Music Arts Projects

Pop culture

Anime North
Brickfete
ConBravo!
Fan Expo Canada
Toronto Comic Arts Festival
Toronto Comicon
Toronto Sketch Comedy Festival

See also

Culture of Toronto
List of festivals in Ontario 
List of festivals in Canada 
Tourism in Toronto

References

External links
 City of Toronto Festival & Events Calendar

 
Toronto
Festivals